Naganur is a village in Belagavi district, Karnataka, India.

Naganur may also refer to:

Naganur (K.D.), a panchayat village in Belgaum district, Karnataka
Naganur (K.M.), a village in Belgaum district, Karnataka
Naganur (K.S.), a village in Belgaum district, Karnataka
Naganur (P.A.), a village in Belgaum district, Karnataka
Naganur (P.K.), a village in Belgaum district, Karnataka